Yponomeuta mahalebella is a moth of the  family Yponomeutidae. It is found in France, Italy and Ukraine.

The larvae feed on Prunus mahaleb. After hatching, young larvae hibernate and become active the following spring. Second instar and older larvae spin a silk tent and feed gregariously on the leaves of their host plant from within this tent. The tent is gradually expanded along the same branch.

Taxonomy
Many authors regard Yponomeuta mahalebella as a form of Yponomeuta padella.

References

Moths described in 1845
Yponomeutidae
Moths of Europe